Ebenweiler is a village in the district of Ravensburg in Baden-Württemberg in Germany.

Population development
1829: 348
1960: 576
1980: 708
1986: 822
2005: 1128 
2018: 1213

References

Ravensburg (district)